Laevagonum is a genus of ground beetles in the family Carabidae. There are about 10 described species in Laevagonum, found on New Guinea.

Species
These 10 species belong to the genus Laevagonum:
 Laevagonum alticola Baehr, 2012
 Laevagonum cistelum Darlington, 1952
 Laevagonum citum Darlington, 1952
 Laevagonum frustum Darlington, 1971
 Laevagonum giluwe Darlington, 1971
 Laevagonum huon Baehr, 2012
 Laevagonum parafrustum Baehr, 2012
 Laevagonum pertenue Darlington, 1971
 Laevagonum subcistelum Darlington, 1952
 Laevagonum subcitum Darlington, 1952

References

Platyninae